Qutb al-Din Ta'us Simnani (fl. 15th century) was a Persian bureaucrat who served as the vizier of the Timurid rulers Abul-Qasim Babur Mirza  and Abu Sa'id Mirza. He traced his descent back to two prominent families of Simnan; from his maternal side he was a descendant of the Balich, and from his paternal side the Bahrami.

References

Sources 
 
 

Officials of the Timurid Empire
Viziers of the Timurid Empire
15th-century Iranian people
Year of birth unknown
People from Semnan, Iran